Luke Sellick (born August 31, 1990) is a Canadian jazz bassist, composer, and bandleader.

Biography 

A native of Winnipeg, Manitoba, Sellick completed his undergraduate degree at the University of Manitoba. He relocated to New York City in 2012 to attend the Juilliard School and study with jazz bassist Ron Carter. He works regularly as a sideman with pianist/singer Johnny O'Neal, saxophonist Jimmy Greene, pianist Orrin Evans, and guitarist Russell Malone.

Sellick released his debut album, "Alchemist," in early 2017 on the Cellar Live label featuring Jimmy Greene, Adam Birnbaum and others.  The album has received rave reviews from critics and currently holds a five star rating on Amazon.  Luke currently resides in New York City where he is working on his latest project, the Luke Sellick Expedition, along with being a mainstay on the jazz circuit and an avid hockey player.

Discography

As leader

As sideman

References

External links 

1990 births
Living people
Canadian jazz composers
Canadian jazz musicians
Juilliard School alumni
Male jazz composers
Musicians from Winnipeg